The Vietnam women's national futsal team represents Vietnam in international women's futsal competitions and is controlled by the Futsal Commission of the Vietnam Football Federation.

Overview 
Preparing for the 2007 Asian Indoor Games from October 26 to November 3 in Macau, the Vietnamese futsal women's squad assembled in Thành Long Sports Centre, Ho Chi Minh City with 16 players.Veterans of the Vietnamese women's football team who have won the SEA Games gold medal three times are included in this list, including Luu Ngoc Mai, Phung Thi Minh Nguyet, Nguyen Hong Phuc, and Nguyen Thi Ha. The squad had its debut international encounter against Uzbekistan in Macau. At the 2007 Asia Indoor Games, the team ended in 4th place. Vietnamese women futsal have competed in two more Asian Indoor Games in 2009 and 2013, both halted at the group stage.Fulsal Vietnam women competed in three Sea Games earning silver medals in 2007, 2011, and 2013.With the Southeast Asian Women's Futsal Championship, Vietnam won the 2013 tournament held in Myanmar. On September 30, they were beaten 2-5 by Thailand in the elimination match, but won the final 4-3 on October 3, 2013. This is the first time, Vietnamese women's futsal in particular and Vietnamese futsal in general defeated Thailand to win Southeast Asia

Achievements

Women's Futsal World Tournament record

AFC Women's Futsal Championship record

Futsal at the Asian Indoor and Martial Arts Games record

Southeast Asian Games record

Honours

Coaching staff

Players

Current squad

Source:

Managers

Results and fixtures
The following is a list of match results in the last 12 months, as well as any future matches that have been scheduled.

2022

References

External links

Asian women's national futsal teams
Futsal
National
Women's football in Vietnam
2007 establishments in Vietnam